The Lord of Losers is a web drama directed by Wei Zheng and starring Li Jiahang, Zhang Yiduo, Guo Guo, Liu Zhongqiu, Tu Hua, Li Wenfan and Sun Yiwen. The play will be broadcast on iQiyi on June 18, 2022.

Broadcasting platform

Synopsis
Hu Qiang (played by Li Jiahang), an honest man who has worked at the grassroots level of the company for ten years, suddenly got a "promotion" opportunity and was transferred to a small department called "Corruption Department" as the manager. His subordinates are all wonderful, thorny programmer Ouyang Murphy (played by Cheng Guo), chicken blood salesman Tang Haixing (played by Zhang Yiduo), gossip secretary Jin Ruoyu (played by Tu Hua), mechanical designer Su Kejie (played by Liu Zhongqiu), weak copywriter Pang Xiaobai (played by Li Wenfan), and the second fool intern Sha Lele (played by Sun Yiwen), the only thing they have in common is that they are all losers. Others work 8 hours, they work ∞ hours, they have endless shit to do every day, and they can eat enough just by suffering. But even so, this group of salted fishes did not intend to lie flat. They struggled hard to save their jobs and lives and staged hilarious stories one after another.

Cast List

References

2022 Chinese television series debuts
Chinese television sitcoms
IQIYI original programming
IQIYI
Television shows filmed in Jiangsu